This article lists the winners and nominees for the NAACP Image Award for Outstanding Actor in a Drama Series. The award was first given in 1972. Not to be confused with the Award for Outstanding Actor in a Television Movie, Mini-Series or Dramatic Special. Currently, LL Cool J holds the record for most wins in the category with four.

Winners and nominees
Winners are listed first and highlighted in bold.

1970s

1980s

1990s

2000s

2010s

2020s

Multiple wins and nominations

Wins

 4 wins
 LL Cool J

 3 wins
 Hill Harper
 Eriq La Salle
 Blair Underwood
 Malik Yoba
 Omari Hardwick

 2 wins
 Sterling K. Brown
 Isaiah Washington
 Howard Rollins

Nominations

 9 nominations
 Hill Harper

 8 nominations
 André Braugher

 7 nominations
 Eriq La Salle
 LL Cool J
 Jesse L. Martin

 6 nominations
 Sterling K. Brown
 Steve Harris
 Omari Hardwick

 5 nominations
 Dennis Haysbert
 Kofi Siriboe
 Blair Underwood

 4 nominations
 Anthony Anderson
 Taye Diggs
 Yaphet Kotto
 Wendell Pierce

 3 nominations
 Omar Epps
 Terrence Howard
 Malik Yoba

 2 nominations
 Michael Beach
 Avery Brooks
 Mike Colter
 Keith David
 Gary Dourdan
 Laurence Fishburne
 Shemar Moore
 Billy Porter
 Isaiah Washington
 Forest Whitaker

References

Outstanding Actor in a Drama Series